Rogers Cable and Telcom may refer to:

Rogers Cable
Rogers Telecom